Mark Solomon may refer to:

 Mark Solomon (Māori leader) (born c. 1954), New Zealand tribal leader
 Mark Solomon (One Life to Live), a character on the American soap opera

See also
 Mark Salomon (born 1970), American singer and songwriter
 Marc Solomon (born 1966), American gay-rights advocate